Windham Technical High School, or Windham Tech, is a technical high school located in Willimantic, Connecticut. It is in the Connecticut Technical High School System.

Technologies
In addition to a complete academic program leading to a high school diploma, students attending Windham Tech receive training in one of the following trades and technologies: 

 Automotive Technology
 Carpentry
 Culinary Arts
 Electrical
 Electronic Tenchology (Soon to be phased out by 2019 to 2020)
 Heating, Ventilation & Air Conditioning (HVAC)
 Health Technology
 Informational System Technologies ( Replacing Electronic Technology 2017–2018 school year)
 Precision Machining Technology
 Sustainable Architecture

References

Public high schools in Connecticut
Educational institutions accredited by the Council on Occupational Education